The 2012 United States House of Representatives elections in New Mexico were held on Tuesday, November 6, 2012, and elected the three U.S. Representatives from the state, one from each of the state's three congressional districts. The elections coincided with the elections of other federal and state offices, including a quadrennial presidential election, and a U.S. Senate election.

Overview

District 1

The redrawn 1st district serves the central area of New Mexico, including almost three-fourths of Albuquerque. Incumbent Democrat Martin Heinrich, first elected in 2008, did not seek reelection, but will instead ran for the U.S. Senate seat vacated by Jeff Bingaman.

Democratic primary

Candidates

Nominee
 Michelle Lujan Grisham, Bernalillo County Commissioner and candidate for this seat in 2008

Eliminated in primary
 Marty Chávez, former Albuquerque Mayor
 Eric Griego, state senator

Declined
 Hector Balderas, State Auditor
 Terry Brunner, head of rural development for the U.S. Department of Agriculture in New Mexico and Jeff Bingaman’s former state director
 Diane Denish, former Lieutenant Governor and nominee for Governor in 2010
 Martin Heinrich, incumbent U.S. Representative
 Timothy M. Keller, state senator
 James B. Lewis, State Treasurer
 Moe Maestas, state representative 
 Stuart Paisano, former governor of Sandia Pueblo

Primary results

Republican primary

Candidates

Nominee
 Janice Arnold-Jones, former state representative

Withdrawn
 Dan Lewis, Albuquerque City Councilmember

Disqualified
 Gary Smith, Army veteran

Declined
 Jon Barela, businessman and nominee for this seat in 2010

Primary results

General election

Endorsements

Polling

Predictions

Results

District 2

Incumbent Republican Steve Pearce was elected in 2010, having previously served from 2003 until 2009. Pearce sought reelection in 2012.

Republican primary

Candidates

Nominee
 Steve Pearce, incumbent U.S. Representative

Primary results

Democratic primary

Candidates

Nominee
 Evelyn Madrid Erhard, former teacher at New Mexico State University

Withdrawn
 Martin Resendiz, Mayor of Sunland Park

Disqualified
 Frank McKinnon, businessman and candidate for this seat in 2008

Declined
 Nate Cote, state representative
 Edgar Lopez, head of a real estate company
 Harry Teague, former U.S. Representative

Primary results

General election

Polling

Results

District 3

Incumbent Democrat Ben Ray Luján was first elected in 2008. In April 2011 Luján declined to enter the U.S. Senate race and instead chose to seek reelection to the House of Representatives.

Democratic primary

Candidates

Nominee
 Ben Ray Luján, incumbent U.S. Representative

Declined
 Sean Closson, artist and hotel worker
 Harry Montoya, Santa Fe County Executive

Primary results

Republican primary

Candidates

Nominee
 Jefferson Byrd, rancher

Eliminated in primary
 Rick Newton, businessman

Primary results

General election

Polling

Results

References

External links
 Elections from the New Mexico Secretary of State
 United States House of Representatives elections in New Mexico, 2012 at Ballotpedia
 New Mexico U.S. House at OurCampaigns.com
 Campaign contributions for U.S. Congressional races in New Mexico at OpenSecrets
 Outside spending at the Sunlight Foundation

2012
New Mexico
United States House of Representatives